Warman is a provincial electoral district for the Legislative Assembly of Saskatchewan, Canada.

The riding was created by redistribution in 2022, taking territory from Martensville-Warman and Biggar-Sask Valley. It will be formally contested in the 30th Saskatchewan general election. It is named after the city of Warman, which is in turn named for journalist Cy Warman. The majority of the riding's population resides in the aforementioned city, but it also includes the towns of Hague, Hepburn, and Osler.

References

Saskatchewan provincial electoral districts